Klara may refer to:

 Klara, a female given name, see Clara (given name)

 Klara (radio), a classical-music radio station in Belgium
 Klara (singer), birth name Klára Vytisková (born 1985), Czech singer
 Klara (Stockholm), an area of central Stockholm
 Klarälven (the Klar River, or River Klara) in Sweden
 VinFast Klara, an electric scooter made in Vietnam